Gianfrancesco Lazotti (born 2 March 1957) is an Italian film  screenwriter and director.

Born in Rome, Lazotti studied at DAMS in Bologna and apprenticed as assistant director to many well-known Italian directors, including Ettore Scola and Dino Risi. Meanwhile, he launched his own career directing commercials and hosting a show on RAI radio. In 1987 he made his feature directorial debut with Il mitico Gianluca for Italian TV. Among his subsequent credits: Schiaffi d'amore, Saremo felici, Lo sbaglio, for the omnibus feature Corsica, the TV series Chiara e gli altri (1990), I ragazzi del muretto, Linda e il brigadiare and the documentary The great Carnival of Venice.

Filmography 
Piazza Navona (1988)
Chiara e gli altri (1989)
Saremo felici (1989)
Senator (1990)
Andy e Norman (1991)
I ragazzi del muretto (1991)
Tutti gli anni una volta l'anno (1995)
Linda e il Brigadiere (1997)
Misteri di Cascina Vienello (1997)
Linda e il brigadiere 2 (1998)
Le ragazze di Piazza di Spagna (1998)
Valeria medico legale (2000)
Angelo il custode (2001)
Diritto di difesa (2005)
Finalmente a casa (2008)
The great Carnival of Venice (2008)
Dalla vita in poi (2010)
La notte è piccola per noi (2018)

References

1957 births
Italian film directors
Italian screenwriters
Italian male screenwriters
Living people
Writers from Rome